André Trousselier (29 May 1887 – 10 April 1968) was a French racing cyclist. He won the 1908 edition of the Liège–Bastogne–Liège.

References

External links

1887 births
1968 deaths
French male cyclists
Cyclists from Paris